Georges Jean Daussy (5 April 1878 – 21 July 1937) was a French fencer. He competed in the men's masters foil event at the 1900 Summer Olympics.

References

External links
 

1878 births
1937 deaths
French male foil fencers
Olympic fencers of France
Fencers at the 1900 Summer Olympics
Sportspeople from Nantes